GameDay is a software program that allows sports fans to track games with live stats.  For Major League Baseball, it was introduced in 2002, a year after all team sites were migrated to MLB.com.  Today the software provides improved features such as camera angle and pitch speed, as well as pitch angle and break.  It also contain a news ticker.  On Yahoo.com this is known as GameChannel.

External links
 Sample baseball game
 Slate.com article about Pitch F/X innovation

Sports software